Kevin A. Brown (born July 8, 1985 in Los Angeles, California) is a former American football defensive tackle. He was signed by the Seattle Seahawks as an undrafted free agent in 2008. He played college football at UCLA.

External links

Seattle Seahawks bio
UCLA Bruins bio

1985 births
Living people
Players of American football from Los Angeles
American football defensive tackles
UCLA Bruins football players
Seattle Seahawks players